The McLaren MP4/13 was the car with which the McLaren team competed in the 1998 Formula One World Championship. The chassis was designed by Adrian Newey, Steve Nichols, Neil Oatley and Henri Durand, with Mario Illien designing the bespoke Ilmor engine. Driven by Mika Häkkinen and David Coulthard, the MP4/13 proved to be the dominant car of the season, with Häkkinen winning eight races en route to his first Drivers' Championship, while McLaren won their first Constructors' Championship since  and, their last.

The team's main sponsor was West, whose logos were not featured on the cars at the French, British and German Grands Prix due to the tobacco sponsorship bans in these countries.

History

His work was rewarded when drivers Mika Häkkinen and David Coulthard finished first and second at the season-ending European Grand Prix.

When the 1998 season got underway four months later, it became clear that Newey had adapted to the rule changes for 1998 best. With the cars now narrower and running on grooved tyres, the all-new design of the MP4/13 made it the car to beat.

The dominance of the MP4/13 was displayed in the opening race of 1998 in Australia, as Häkkinen and Coulthard finished a lap ahead of the rest of the field. Newey's aerodynamic design was by far the most efficient one and Mercedes produced the most powerful engine of the season. The team was aided by a unique brake-steer system which allowed the driver to use any one of the car's brakes independently to aid cornering, a system first used in 1997. The Ferrari team protested, stating that the brake-steer system was a violation of the technical rules, which banned four-wheel steering. The FIA eventually sided with Ferrari and the system was banned, although the team was allowed to keep their results up to that point.

McLaren's dominance continued in the second race of the season in Brazil, before Ferrari started to close the gap from the Argentine Grand Prix onwards. The MP4/13 retained its superiority on high-speed tracks like Hockenheim and Silverstone, while Ferrari's F300 was closer to the McLaren on more technical circuits. Speaking of the MP4/13 some years later, Coulthard said that the car was fast but understeered through slow corners; this was due to Newey's design that maximized the car's aerodynamic grip over its mechanical grip. Häkkinen initially found the car to be nervous on testing due to a rearward biased instability, but this was corrected before the season started.

Although Ferrari's Michael Schumacher took the Drivers' Championship battle to the final race in Japan, Häkkinen took the title with his eighth race win of the season. Coulthard won one race, in San Marino, en route to third place overall, while McLaren won the Constructors' Championship. This was McLaren's first championship victory since  with Ayrton Senna and, in terms of race wins, the team's most successful year since .

During 1998 both Nick Heidfeld and Ricardo Zonta acted as test drivers for McLaren and drove the MP4/13 at test sessions. The record time for the Goodwood Festival of Speed hillclimb was set in 1999 when Heidfeld drove an MP4/13 up the hill in 41.6 seconds. Twenty four years later the MP4/13 set the second outright fastest lap time around  Laguna Seca in the hands of Mexican IndyCar driver Pato O'Ward, when O'Ward lapped the circuit at 1 minute 10.3 seconds, nearly a second faster than a McLaren IndyCar around the same circuit.

Other
In July 2017, video game developer Codemasters announced that the MP4/13 would appear in the video game F1 2017 as a classic car. It also appears in F1 2018 and F1 2019.

Technical specifications

Car: McLaren MP4/13
 Chassis: carbon fibre, aluminium
 Gearbox: 6 gears
 Cooling system: two McLaren/Calsonic water radiators, two McLaren/Marston oil radiators.
 Length of the whole car: 
 Weight with water, oil and driver:

Engine: Mercedes-Benz FO-110G
 Cylinders: 10, in a 72° angle
 Valves: 4 per cylinder
 Length: 
 Breadth: 
 Height: 
 Weight: 
 Power:

Supplies

 Tyres: Bridgestone
 Wheels: Enkei 13-in
 Brakes: AP Racing discs and claws
 Oil and Petrol: Mobil
 Ignition: TAG 2000
 Spark plugs: NGK

Complete Formula One results
(key) (results in bold indicate pole position; results in italics indicate fastest lap)

References

AUTOCOURSE 1998-99, Henry, Alan (ed.), Hazleton Publishing Ltd. (1998)

External links

McLaren Formula One cars
1998 Formula One season cars
Formula One championship-winning cars